Lieutenant Alec George Horwood,  (6 January 1914 – 20 January 1944) was a British Army officer and an English recipient of the Victoria Cross (VC), the highest award for gallantry in the face of the enemy that can be awarded to British and Commonwealth forces.

Details
Mobilised for war in 1939, Horwood was captured at Dunkirk and managed to escape via Antwerp. He was awarded the Distinguished Conduct Medal for his efforts.

Horwood was 30 years old, and a lieutenant in the 1/6th Battalion, Queen's Royal Regiment (West Surrey), British Army, attached to 1st Battalion, Northamptonshire Regiment during the Second World War when the following deed took place for which he was awarded the Victoria Cross.

On 18 January 1944 at Kyauchaw, British Burma (now Myanmar), Lieutenant Horwood accompanied a company into action with his forward mortar observation post. Throughout the day he was in an exposed position and under intense fire, but he came back at night with most valuable information about the enemy. On 19 January he moved forward and established another observation post, directing accurate mortar fire in support of two attacks, and also carrying out personal reconnaissance, deliberately drawing the enemy fire so that their position could be definitely located. On 20 January he volunteered to lead the attack and while doing so was mortally wounded.

His Victoria Cross is on display in the Lord Ashcroft Gallery at the Imperial War Museum, London.

References

External links
 CWGC entry
 
 Profile

1914 births
1944 deaths
British Army recipients of the Victoria Cross
British Army personnel killed in World War II
British World War II recipients of the Victoria Cross
Escapees from German detention
People from Deptford
Queen's Royal Regiment officers
Recipients of the Distinguished Conduct Medal
Military personnel from London